Bronchopulmonary dysplasia (BPD; part of the spectrum of chronic lung disease of infancy) is a chronic lung disease in which premature infants, usually those who were treated with supplemental oxygen, require long-term oxygen. The alveoli that are present tend to not be mature enough to function normally. It is more common in infants with low birth weight (LBW) and those who receive prolonged mechanical ventilation to treat respiratory distress syndrome (RDS). It results in significant morbidity and mortality.  The definition of BPD has continued to evolve primarily due to changes in the population, such as more survivors at earlier gestational ages, and improved neonatal management including surfactant, antenatal glucocorticoid therapy, and less aggressive mechanical ventilation.

Currently the description of BPD includes the grading of its severity into mild, moderate and severe. This correlates with the infant's maturity, growth and overall severity of illness. The new system offers a better description of underlying pulmonary disease and its severity.

Presentation

Complications 
Feeding problems are common in infants with bronchopulmonary dysplasia, often due to prolonged intubation. Such infants often display oral-tactile hypersensitivity (also known as oral aversion).

Physical findings:
 hypoxemia;
 hypercapnia;
 crackles, wheezing, & decreased breath sounds;
 increased bronchial secretions;
 hyperinflation;
 frequent lower respiratory infections;
 delayed growth & development;
 cor pulmonale;
 CXR shows with hyperinflation, low diaphragm, atelectasis, cystic changes.

Cause 
Prolonged high oxygen delivery in premature infants causes necrotizing bronchiolitis and alveolar septal injury, with inflammation and scarring. This results in hypoxemia. Today, with the advent of surfactant therapy and high frequency ventilation and oxygen supplementation, infants with BPD experience much milder injury without necrotizing bronchiolitis or alveolar septal fibrosis. Instead, there are usually uniformly dilated acini with thin alveolar septa and little or no interstitial fibrosis. It develops most commonly in the first 4 weeks after birth.

Diagnosis

Earlier criteria
The classic diagnosis of BPD may be assigned at 28 days of life if the following criteria are met:
 Positive pressure ventilation during the first 2 weeks of life for a minimum of 3 days.
 Clinical signs of abnormal respiratory function.
 Requirements for supplemental oxygen for longer than 28 days of age to maintain PaO2 above 50 mm Hg.
 Chest radiograph with diffuse abnormal findings characteristic of BPD.

Newer criteria

The 2006 National Institute of Health (US) criteria for BPD (for neonates treated with more than 21% oxygen for at least 28 days) is as follows:,

Mild
 Breathing room air at 36 weeks' post-menstrual age or discharge (whichever comes first) for babies born before 32 weeks, or
 breathing room air by 56 days' postnatal age, or discharge (whichever comes first) for babies born after 32 weeks' gestation.

Moderate
 Need for <30% oxygen at 36 weeks' postmenstrual age, or discharge (whichever comes first) for babies born before 32 weeks, or
 need for <30% oxygen to 56 days' postnatal age, or discharge (whichever comes first) for babies born after 32 weeks' gestation.

Severe
 Need for >30% oxygen, with or without positive pressure ventilation or continuous positive pressure at 36 weeks' postmenstrual age, or discharge (whichever comes first) for babies born before 32 weeks, or
 need for >30% oxygen with or without positive pressure ventilation or continuous positive pressure at 56 days' postnatal age, or discharge (whichever comes first) for babies born after 32 weeks' gestation.

Management
Infants with bronchopulmonary dysplasia are often treated with diuretics that decrease fluid in the alveoli where gas exchange occurs and bronchodilators that relax the airway muscles to facilitate breathing. To alleviate bronchopulmonary dysplasia, caffeine is another commonly used treatment that reduces inflammation and increases lung volume thereby improving extubation success and decreasing the duration of mechanical ventilation. Viral immunization is important for these children who have a higher risk of infections in the respiratory tract.

Corticosteroid treatment 
There is evidence that steroids (systemic corticosteroid treatment) given to babies less than 7 days old can prevent bronchopulmonary dysplasia. This treatment increases the risk of neurodevelopmental sequelae (cerebral palsy) and gastrointestinal perforation. 

For babies 7 days old and older, "late systemic postnatal corticosteroid treatment" may reduce the risk of death and of bronchopulmonary dysplasia. There is some evidence that this treatment does not increase the risk of cerebral palsy, however, long-term studies considering the neurodevelopmental outcomes is needed to further understand the risk of this treatment option. Late systemic postnatal corticosteroid treatment is therefore only recommended for babies 7 days old or older who cannot be taken off of a ventilator. The benefit and risks of systemic corticosteroid treatment in older babies who are not intubated (on a ventilator) is not known.

Vitamin A 
Vitamin A treatment in low birth weight babies may improve the 36-week mortality risk, decrease the days of mechanical ventilation, and decrease the incidence of bronchopulmonary dysplasia.

Other 
Oxygen therapy at home is recommended in those with significant low oxygen levels.

Hypercarbia (too much carbon dioxide in the blood) may contribute to the development of bronchopulmonary dysplasia. Monitoring the level of carbon dioxide in neonatal infants to ensure that the level is not too high or too low (hypocarbia) is important for improving outcomes for neonates in intensive care.  Carbon dioxide can be monitored by taking a blood sample (arterial blood gas), through the breath (exhalation), and it can be measured continuously through the skin by using a minimally invasive transcutaneous device. The most effective and safest approach for measuring carbon dioxide in newborn infants is not clear.

Epidemiology
The rate of BPD varies among institutions, which may reflect neonatal risk factors, care practices (e.g., target levels for acceptable oxygen saturation), and differences in the clinical definitions of BPD.

See also 
 Respiratory distress syndrome
 Wilson–Mikity syndrome

References

Further reading 
 
 Bronchopulmonary Dysplasia on National Institutes of Health

External links 

Bronchus disorders
Neonatology